The 2016 Charlotte Independence season is the club's second year of existence, and their second season in the third tier of the United States Soccer Pyramid. It is their second season in the United Soccer League as part of the Eastern Conference.

Roster
As of March 1, 2016

Competitions

USL Regular season

Standings

Matches
All times in regular season on Eastern Daylight Time (UTC-04:00)

Schedule source

U.S. Open Cup

Friendlies

References

2016 USL season
American soccer clubs 2016 season
2016 in sports in North Carolina
Charlotte Independence seasons